WAGH (101.3 FM) is a radio station broadcasting an Urban Adult Contemporary music format. WAGH is licensed to serve the community of Smiths, Alabama, United States.  The station is currently owned by iHeartMedia, Inc. (with the license held by iHM Licenses, LLC) and features programming from Westwood One and Premiere Networks.  Its studios are in Columbus east of downtown, and its transmitter is outside Ladonia, Alabama.

In September 2004, this station, then known as WBFA, flipped from a contemporary hit radio format branded as "B101" to an urban contemporary/hip-hop music format branded as "The Beat". In September 2007, this format, branding, and the WBFA call letters were swapped with sister station WAGH. The station was assigned the WAGH call letters by the Federal Communications Commission on September 4, 2007.

References

External links

AGH
Urban adult contemporary radio stations in the United States
Radio stations established in 1998
1998 establishments in Alabama
IHeartMedia radio stations